Cock-a-Doodle Dandy is a 1949 play by Irish dramatist Seán O'Casey.
Regarded by O'Casey as his best play, this is a darkly comic fantasy in which a magic cockerel appears in the parish of Nyadnanave and forces the characters to make choices about the way they live their lives. It is a parable of mid-century Irish rural life, symbolising the struggle between repression and liberty. Initially it was regarded as anti-Catholic and was banned from professional public performance in the UK by the Lord Chamberlain. It was also suppressed in Ireland and the USA.

In performance

The World premiere of the play took place at the People's Theatre, Newcastle upon Tyne in 1949. This performance was reviewed in the Irish Times newspaper on 14 December 1949. Under the headline "A Play to Arouse both Anger and Pity", it was described as "a performance of infinitely better quality than I had expected to lie in the capacity of mere Anglo-Saxons, unlearned in the tricky inflexions of O'Casey's Nyadnanave."

The British premiere was at the Edinburgh Festival on 7 September 1959. It was performed by The English Stage Company and directed by George Devine.

Characters
The Cock 
Michael Marthraun
Sailor Mahan 
Lorna
Loreleen
Marion
Shanaar 
First rough fellow 
Second rough fellow
Father Domineer 
The Sargeant 
A Mayor
Julia 
Jack 
Julia's Father
A Porter 
One-eyed Larry 
A  Mace-bearer
The Bellman 
The Messenger

References

Sources
 Banham, Martin, ed. 1998. The Cambridge Guide to Theatre. Cambridge: Cambridge UP. .

1949 plays
Plays by Seán O'Casey